Ba River may refer to several rivers:

Ba River (China)
Ba River (Fiji)
Ba River (Scotland), on the Isle of Mull flows from the Loch Bà, Mull
Ba River (Vietnam), the upstream part of Đà Rằng River